Ratan Parimoo (born 1936 in Srinagar, Jammu and Kashmir, British India) is an art historian and painter of modern India who was a professor of Art History at the M.S. University in Vadodara. 

Ratan Parimoo was one of the founder members of Baroda Group

Books

Paintings of the Three Tagores (1973)
Studies in Modern Indian Art (1975)
Life of Buddha in Indian Sculpture (1982)
Sculptures of Sheshashayi Vishnu (1983)
The Paintings of Rabindranath Tagore (1989)
The Pictorial World of Gaganendranath Tagore (1995)
Studies in Indian Sculpture (1999)
Ceaseless Creativity, Paintings, Prints and Drawings. Edited by Gauri Parimoo Krishnan, 1999.

External links 
https://web.archive.org/web/20070929082616/http://www.ratanparimoo.com/

References

1936 births
Living people
Kashmiri Pandits
Indian people of Kashmiri descent
Indian male painters
Indian art historians
People from Srinagar
20th-century Indian painters
20th-century Indian historians
Painters from Jammu and Kashmir
20th-century Indian male artists